The Viote Alpine Botanical Garden (Giardino Botanico Alpino Viote) (10 hectares) is an alpine botanical garden operated by the Museo tridentino di scienze naturali, and located in Viotte di Monte Bondone, southwest of Trento, Trentino-Alto Adige/Südtirol, Italy. It is open daily in the warmer months; an admission fee is charged.

The garden was established in 1938, damaged in World War II, and renewed in 1958. Plants are grouped in beds by areas of origin, such as the Pyrenees, the Alps, the Apennines, the Balkans, Carpathians, Caucasus, the Americas, and the Himalayas. American genera include Arnica, Eriophyllum, Lewisia, Liatris, Phlox, Penstemon, and Silphium; Himalayan genera include Androsace, Gentiana, Incarvillea, Leontopodium, Meconopsis, Potentilla, and Veronica.  

Species of particular interest include Artemisia petrosa, Daphne petraea, Ephedra helvetica, Fritillaria tubaeformis, Linaria tonzigi, Paederota bonarota, Rhizobotrya alpina, Sanguisorba dodecandra, Saxifraga arachnoidea, Saxifraga tombeanensis, Scabiosa vestina, Silene elisabethae, and Viola dubyana. The garden also includes a nature trail (1000 meters) through indigenous vegetation, including Drosera rotundifolia and Pinguicula vulgaris.

See also 

 List of botanical gardens in Italy

References 
 F. Pedrotti, "Il Giardino Botanico Alpino alle Viotte del Monte Bondone (Trento)", in F. M. Raimondo (ed.), Orti Botanici, Giardini Alpini, Arboreti Italiani, Edizioni Grifo, Palermo, pp 417–422, 1992.
 F. Pedrotti and F. Da Trieste, "Il sentiero naturalistico del Giardino Botanico Alpino delle Viotte del Monte Bondone (Trento)", in Atti Riunione scientitica sul tema: Didattica preuniversitaria negli Orti Botanici, Arco e Trento, settembre 1994. Inf. Bot. Ital., 28(1):125-127, 1996.
 F. Pedrotti and F. Da Trieste, "Conservazione ex situ di specie endemiche e rare nel Giardino Botanico Alpino delle Viotte del Monte Bondone (Trento)", Museol. sci., 14(1), Suppl.:605-610, 1998.

External links
 Giardino Botanico delle Viote
 Photographs

Botanical gardens in Italy
Geography of Trentino
Gardens in Trentino-Alto Adige/Südtirol